The Combined Joint Task Force–Space Operations (CJTF–SO) is a subordinate command to the United States Space Command. It was activated on 15 November 2022.

Structure 
 Combined Force Space Component Command (CFSCC), Vandenberg Space Force Base, California
 Combined Space Operations Center (CSpOC), Vandenberg Space Force Base, California
 Missile Warning Center (MWC), Cheyenne Mountain Space Force Station, Colorado
 Joint Overhead Persistent Infrared Center (JOPC), Buckley Space Force Base, Colorado
 Joint Navigation Warfare Center (JNWC), Kirtland Air Force Base, New Mexico
 Joint Task Force–Space Defense (JTF–SD), Schriever Space Force Base, Colorado
 National Space Defense Center (NSDC), Schriever Space Force Base, Colorado

List of commanders

References

See also 
 United States Space Command

Joint task forces of the United States Armed Forces
Military units and formations established in 2022
Space units and formations of the United States